Located in Hollywood, Los Angeles Contemporary Exhibitions (LACE) is a nonprofit exhibition space and archive of the visual arts for the city of Los Angeles, California, United States, currently under the leadership of Sarah Russin.

History

In the mid-1970s, artists began living in large, inexpensive lofts built into the empty warehouses of downtown Los Angeles.  LACE was initially located in the same area on Broadway, later moving to an industrial neighborhood near the Los Angeles River, and finally to Hollywood.

Founded in 1978 by a group of thirteen artists and based upon principles of grassroots community organizing and social change, LACE committed from the start to presenting experimental works of art in all media, including the then-experimental media of performance art and video. In 1982, Joy Silverman was appointed the first executive director. LACE provided an early venue for artists like Laurie Anderson, Nancy Buchanan, Chris Burden, Gronk, Ishmael Houston-Jones, Mike Kelley, Martin Kersels, Linda Nishio, Paper Tiger TV, Adrian Piper, Judith Simonian, Johanna Went, David Wojnarowicz, Bruce and Norman Yonemoto, and Liz Young.  The presence of performance art and video in major museums suggest that these experimental media are now part of the artistic canon and testifies to the success of LACE to promote these media to a wider audience.

Originally located in Downtown Los Angeles, LACE moved to Hollywood in 1994.  LACE has partnered with various organizations like YMCA, the Los Angeles LGBT Center, My Friend's Place, and Woodbury University.  LACE also partners with other organizations including the Getty Museum, the Fellows of Contemporary Art, the California Institute of the Arts, the California College of the Arts in Oakland, Washington University in St. Louis, Kent State University, Atlanta College of Art, and Contemporary Art Gallery in Vancouver, British Columbia.

In 1998, LACE inaugurated Contemporary Editions LA, a fine-art publishing venture featuring Los Angeles-based artists, with editions in its first year by Paul McCarthy, Martin Kersels, and Sharon Lockhart.  The following year, space published three new editions by artists Kevin Appel, Evan Holloway, and James Welling.  In 2002, LACE published Contemporary Editions by John Baldessari, Laura Owens, and Raymond Pettibon.

In 2005, LACE published new editions with artists Amy Adler, Jeff Burton, and the 2006 Whitney Biennial artist Monica Majoli.

Selected exhibitions

 1999: Amy Adler Curates Joni Mitchell.
 2000: Matt Mullican
 2001: Michael Brewster
 2002: "Democracy When?  Activist Strategizing in Los Angeles"
 2002: Marilyn Manson, The Golden Age of Grotesque
 2003: Chris Burden
 2004: Yvonne Rainer
 2005: LACE partners with Nike to present the US premiere of "White Dunk," a touring exhibition featuring 26 Japanese artists.
 2011: Cassils, Cuts: A Traditional Sculpture
 2012: Steve Roden, Shells, Bells, Steps and Silences
 2015: Rafa Esparza, i have never been here before

References

External links

Art museums and galleries in Los Angeles
Performance art in Los Angeles
Contemporary art galleries in the United States
Art galleries established in 1978
1978 establishments in California
Buildings and structures in Hollywood, Los Angeles